Diving at the 2018 Summer Youth Olympics was held from 13 to 17 October at the Natatorium in Buenos Aires, Argentina.

Qualification

Each National Olympic Committee (NOC) can enter 2 athletes, 1 in each gender. As hosts, Argentina is given four quotas, 1 for each event. 8 athletes, 2 in each event will be decided by the Tripartite Commission. The remaining 36 places shall be decided at the World Junior Diving Championship.

To be eligible to participate at the Youth Olympics athletes must have been born between 1 January 2000 and 31 December 2002.

3m Springboard

10m Platform

Summary

Medal summary

Medal table

Events

References

External links
Official Results Book – Diving

 
2018 Summer Youth Olympics events
Youth Summer Olympics
2018
Diving competitions in Argentina